The sanderling (Calidris alba) is a small wading bird. The name derives from Old English sand-yrðling, "sand-ploughman". The genus name is from Ancient Greek kalidris or skalidris, a term used by Aristotle for some grey-coloured waterside birds. The specific, alba, is Latin for "white".

It is a circumpolar Arctic breeder, and is a long-distance migrant, wintering south to South America, South Europe, Africa, and Australia. It is highly gregarious in winter, sometimes forming large flocks on coastal mudflats or sandy beaches.

It is somewhat unlike other sandpipers in appearance, which has led to the suggestion that it should be placed into a monotypic genus Crocethia. A more recent review (Thomas et al., 2004) indicates, however, that the sanderling is a fairly typical "stint" or small sandpiper and should be separated from the large knots with its closest relatives in a distinct genus.

This bird is similar in size to a dunlin, but stouter, with a thick bill. It shows a strong white wingbar in flight, and runs along the sandy beaches it prefers with a characteristic "bicycling" action of its legs, stopping frequently to pick small food items. It eats small crabs and other small invertebrates. In spring, birds migrating north from South America consume large numbers of horseshoe crab eggs in the Delaware Bay area.

In spring, the birds arrive on the High Arctic breeding grounds (see map), where they lay 3–4 eggs in a ground scrape. On the nesting grounds, these birds mainly eat insects and some plant material.

The sanderling was described by the German naturalist Peter Simon Pallas in 1764 and given the binomial name Trynga alba.

The sanderling is one of the species to which the Agreement on the Conservation of African-Eurasian Migratory Waterbirds (AEWA) applies.

Description
The sanderling is a small plump sandpiper,  in length. The winter bird is very pale, almost white apart from a dark shoulder patch. This is the source of the specific name, alba, which is the Latin for "white". Later in the summer, the face and throat become brick-red. The juvenile bird is spangled black and white, and shows much more contrast than the adult.

If its size is misjudged, a sanderling in breeding plumage can be mistaken for some varieties of stint, or a sanderling in winter plumage can be mistaken for a dunlin or red knot. It can be told from other small wading birds, given good views, by its lack of a hind toe. Its behavior is also distinctive.

Distribution, habitat and migration 

The sanderling breeds in the High Arctic areas of North America, Europe and Asia. In North America, it breeds in the Canadian Arctic Archipelago, Nunavut, Greenland (and to a lesser extent Alaska). In Eurasia, it breeds in Spitsbergen and areas of northern Russia from the Taymyr Peninsula to the New Siberian Islands. In the northern winter, it has a nearly cosmopolitan distribution across the world's marine coasts. Birds that travel further also arrive later and leave sooner. Most adults leave the breeding grounds in July and early August, whereas juvenile birds leave in late August and early September. The northward migration begins in March at the southern end of their winter distribution.

The breeding habitat of the sanderling is coastal tundra north of  July isotherm. During the winter and its migration, it is most commonly found on coastal sandy beaches, but also occurs on tidal sand flats, mud flats and the shores of lakes and rivers. More infrequently, it may occur on rocky shores.

Subspecies

The sanderling consists of two subspecies:

C. a. alba, (Pallas, 1764), breeds on Ellesmere Island, north & east Greenland, Svalbard, Franz Josef Land and the Taymyr Peninsula
C. a. rubida, (Gmelin, 1789), breeds in northeast Siberia, Alaska and northern Canada

Behaviour

Feeding behaviour

Sanderlings feed on invertebrate prey buried in the sand in the upper intertidal zone. In North America, this diet largely consists of the isopods Excirolana linguifrons, Excirolana kincaidii, and the mole crab, Emerita analoga. When the tide is out, these crustaceans live in burrows some way beneath the surface. When the tide comes in, they move into the upper layers of sand and feed on the plankton and detritus that washes over them with each wave. They then burrow rapidly down again as the water retreats. They leave no marks on the surface, so the sanderlings hunt for them by plunging their beaks into the sand at random, consuming whatever they find. Their bills can penetrate only  and as the water swirls around and retreats, the sand is softer; this makes it easier for the birds' beaks to penetrate further. In the spring, when much breeding activity is taking place in the benthic community, there may be as many as 4000 invertebrates per square metre, but their average size is smaller than later in the year. The birds appear to rush madly around at the edge of the surf, but in reality they are maximising their chances of catching as many prey animals as possible when they are at their most vulnerable near the surface.

Breeding behaviour
At breeding time sanderlings are territorial, with the male aggressively defending its territory. They may either form monogamous pairs or polyandrous (one female and two male) pairings.

Gallery

Notes

Footnotes

References

External links

 Sanderling Species text in The Atlas of Southern African Birds
 
 Sanderling Species Account — Cornell Lab of Ornithology
 Sanderling - Calidris alba — USGS Patuxent Bird Identification InfoCenter
 
 
 
 
 
 
 
 

Calidris
Erolia
Sandpipers
Birds of the Arctic
Birds of the Dominican Republic
Birds of the Caribbean
Cosmopolitan birds
Birds described in 1764
Taxa named by Peter Simon Pallas
Holarctic birds